"Every Little Step" is a 1989 single by American singer Bobby Brown, written by L.A. Reid and Kenneth "Babyface" Edmonds and released by MCA Records. Released as the fourth single on his second album Don't Be Cruel it reached number three on the Billboard Hot 100, number one on the Hot Black Singles chart, and number six on the UK Singles Chart in 1989. The song also appears on Brown's remix album Dance!...Ya Know It!. The single garnered Brown's first career Grammy Award for Best Male R&B Vocal Performance at the 32nd Grammy Awards in 1990.

Composition and production 
Around the time Don't Be Cruel was in production, Reid was dating singer Pebbles, who later became his wife. Inspired by his relationship with his girlfriend at the time, he wrote and co-produced the song with Edmonds, intending to give it to the group Midnight Star. Bobby Brown, however, heard a demo of the song and liked it instantly, which led to its inclusion on Don't Be Cruel.

Brown popularized the Roger Rabbit dance (aka the "backwards" running man), as performed in the music video for the song, along with the Gumby-style hi-top fade.

In 1995, "Every Little Step" was remixed by British DJ/producer C.J. Mackintosh and was included on Brown's remix album, Two Can Play That Game (1995). This version of the song was released as a single in 1996, reaching number 25 in the UK Singles Chart.

In 2013, former New Edition manager Steven Machat claimed additional vocals on the song were allegedly done by Brown's friend, and fellow New Edition member Ralph Tresvant. 
Machat alleges that Tresvant was brought in to sing some of Brown's vocals, as he claims Brown had been strung out on drugs. Machat's story contradicts what happened with Brown as far back as 1989, where he was interviewed by Rolling Stone during the filming of the video for "On Our Own". Brown said he left New Edition primarily because of Machat and his business partners, Bill Dern and Rick Smith, whom he named as the managers who ripped him off and started the rumor of him being heavily addicted to drugs at the time. Brown said, "People at MCA thought we was on drugs. That wasn't us. We were a bunch of brats, but we wasn't into drugs, we wasn't into liquor. We was into girls".

Track listing

A-side
 "Every Little Step" (Extended Version) – 7:55
 "Every Little Step" (Instrumental) – 4:02

Charts

Weekly charts

Year-end charts

Certifications

Additional personnel
 L.A. Reid: remixing, drum programming, percussion
 Donald K. Parks: Fairlight programming
 Kayo: Pro-One synth bass
 Daryl Simmons & Karyn White: background vocals

References

External links

1989 singles
Bobby Brown songs
Songs written by Babyface (musician)
Songs written by L.A. Reid
Song recordings produced by Babyface (musician)
1988 songs
MCA Records singles
Music videos directed by Alek Keshishian
Song recordings produced by L.A. Reid